Jacob Francis Tamme (born March 15, 1985) is a former American football tight end. He played college football at Kentucky and was drafted by the Indianapolis Colts in the fourth round of the 2008 NFL Draft.

Tamme also played for the Denver Broncos, Atlanta Falcons, and Los Angeles Kiss

Early years
Tamme graduated from Boyle County High School in Danville, Kentucky, where he was a multi-sport star in football, baseball, and basketball.

He was a four-year letterman and three-year starter at wide receiver and cornerback for Boyle County, who won four consecutive state championships, two in Class AA and two in Class AAA, and had a 58-2 record over those seasons. He was a first-team all-state selection as a senior by the Associated Press and Louisville's The Courier-Journal when he caught 46 passes for 797 yards, a 17.3-yard average, and 13 touchdowns. In addition, he was a finalist for the Kentucky "Mr. Football" Award, given to the top performer in high school football.

His career totals include 97 receptions for 1,866 yards, a 19.2-yard average, and 32 touchdowns. On defense, he intercepted 23 passes, including two returns for touchdowns. As a kick returner, he took 25 punts for 395 yards, a 15.8-yard average, and two touchdowns.

College career
As a redshirt freshman, he played in all 11 games for the Kentucky Wildcats. He started three games at wide receiver before moving to his more natural position of tight end for the season-ending game at Tennessee. For the season, he had 16 catches for 161 yards, third on the team that year. He was also named to the SEC Academic Honor Roll for excellent work in the classroom.

As a redshirt sophomore, he played in all 11 games, starting 10. He was second on the team in pass receptions with 29 catches for 253 yards and one touchdown. On special teams, he blocked punts vs. Louisville and Florida. He also earned a slot on the SEC Academic Honor Roll for the second straight year.

As a redshirt junior, he was voted to the All-SEC first-team by the SEC coaches and the Associated Press. He led SEC tight ends in receptions with 32, netting 386 receiving yards and two touchdowns. He made the SEC Academic Honor Roll for the third year in a row.

As a redshirt senior, he had 56 receptions for 619 yards and six touchdowns. For the second year in a row, he earned first-team All-SEC honors from both the Associated Press (unanimous decision) and coaches polls.

Tamme finished his career as Kentucky's all-time top pass-catching tight end and 2nd in the history of all SEC tight ends with 133 catches for 1,417 yards.

Accolades

As one of the top scholar-athletes in the country, Tamme completed his degree in integrated strategic communications in only three years and earned his MBA just before entering the NFL.

Known for his contributions back to the community, in 2006, he was named to the National Good Works Team by the American Football Coaches Association, the SEC Community Service Team by the SEC Office, and to the Frank G. Ham Society of Character by UK Athletics.

In 2007, he was one of 15 finalists  for the prestigious Draddy Trophy, which is presented to the top scholar athlete in the country. He gave the acceptance speech on behalf of the 15 finalists at the award ceremony in New York City.

Also in 2007, he was named the SEC Scholar Athlete of the Year and elected to the first-team Academic All-America squad by the College Sports Information Directors of America.

He was the 2007 recipient of the Bobby Bowden Award, a national honor presented by the Fellowship of Christian Athletes.

Tamme was inducted in 2018 to the University of Kentucky Athletics Hall of Fame.

Professional career

Indianapolis Colts

The Indianapolis Colts selected Tamme in the fourth round (127th overall) of the 2008 NFL Draft. Tamme was the ninth tight end drafted in 2008. He and the Colts agreed to a 4-year contract with undisclosed terms on July 23, 2008.

2008 season
As a rookie in 2008, Tamme appeared in 12 games with 12 receiving yards.

2009 season
In 2009, Tamme appeared in all 16 games (started 1) with 35 receiving yards. He helped the Colts into Super Bowl XLIV, but lost to the New Orleans Saints 31-17.

2010 season
After Week 7 of 2010 season, Dallas Clark was placed on Injured Reserve after an injury to wrist and Tamme took over as the starting tight end. Tamme surprised everyone by producing good statistical numbers and brought comparisons between him and Dallas Clark.
Tamme finished the season with a career-high 67 receptions for 631 yards and 4 touchdowns.

2011 season
His numbers declined in 2011 due to the absence of Peyton Manning. He finished the year with 177 receiving yards and a touchdown.

Denver Broncos
Tamme signed for three years and $9 million with the Denver Broncos on March 23, 2012. His contract included $3.5 million in guaranteed money.

2012 season
Tamme improved much in the 2012 year as Peyton Manning also signed for the Broncos. Tamme finished the 2012 year with 555 receiving yards and 2 touchdowns.

2013 season
Tamme was part of a Broncos offensive that was franchise-setting, becoming the first time an NFL team scored over 600 points in 16 regular season games that year. For the 2013 year, Tamme produced 184 receiving yards and 2 touchdowns. He and Manning helped the Broncos reach Super Bowl XLVIII. In the Super Bowl, Tamme had 2 catches for 9 yards, but lost 43-8 to the Seattle Seahawks.

2014 season
Tamme played in 15 games and had 14 receptions for 109 yards and two touchdowns.

Atlanta Falcons

2015 season
Tamme signed with the Atlanta Falcons on March 19, 2015. He finished the season with 59 catches for a career-high 657 yards and one touchdown.

2016 season
Tamme played in 8 games, and had 22 receptions, 3 for touchdowns, He was placed on injured reserve on November 21, 2016, after undergoing season-ending shoulder surgery.

Retirement

On November 23, 2017, Tamme announced his retirement from the NFL.

Personal life
Tamme is a Christian. He has spoken about his faith saying, "My faith is important because it's the core of why I believe we exist as humans. Faith allows us to spend an eternity with God and it fuels my every day actions. I've seen how having faith in God can change lives and it certainly has changed mine."
Tamme is married to his high school sweetheart, the former Allison Elmore.

References

External links
Kentucky Wildcats bio
Atlanta Falcons bio

1985 births
Living people
People from Danville, Kentucky
Christians from Kentucky
Players of American football from Lexington, Kentucky
Boyle County High School alumni
American football tight ends
Kentucky Wildcats football players
Indianapolis Colts players
Denver Broncos players
Atlanta Falcons players